BAFF may refer to:

B-cell activating factor
British Armed Forces Federation
British Air Forces in France
Regina Baff, actress